Emeka is a name of Nigerian origins. It is an abbreviation of the Igbo name Chukwuemeka, meaning "God has done so much".

Notable people with the surname "Emeka" include
Anthony Emeka (born 1990), Nigerian footballer
Chinonso Emeka (born 2001), Nigerian footballer
Francis Emeka (born 1990), Nigerian footballer
Princewill Emeka (born 1992), Nigerian footballer

Notable people with the given name "Emeka" include

A
Emeka Ananaba (born 1945), Nigerian politician
Emeka Ani, Nigerian actor
Emeka Anyaoku (born 1933), Nigerian diplomat
Emeka Atuloma (born 1992), Nigerian footballer

E
Emeka Egbuka (born 2002), American football player
Emeka Emerun (born 1994), Nigerian footballer
Emeka Eze (disambiguation), multiple people
Emeka Jude Ezeonu (born 1991), Nigerian footballer
Emeka Ezeugo (born 1965), Nigerian footballer

I
Emeka Ifejiagwa (born 1977), Nigerian footballer
Emeka Ihedioha (born 1965), Nigerian politician
Emeka Ike (born 1967), Nigerian actor

M
Emeka Mamale (born 1977), Congolese footballer

N
Emeka Nnamani (born 2001), Danish footballer
Emeka Nwadike (born 1978), English footballer
Emeka Nwajiobi (born 1959), Nigerian footballer
Emeka Nwokedi, Nigerian conductor

O
Emeka Obi (born 2001), English-Nigerian footballer
Emeka Obidile (born 1977), Nigerian footballer
Emeka Offor (born 1959), Nigerian entrepreneur
Emeka Ogboh (born 1977), Nigerian sound artist
Emeka Ogbugh (born 1990), Nigerian footballer
Emeka Oguzie (born 1972), Nigerian chemist
Emeka Okafor (born 1982), American basketball player
Emeka Okereke (born 1980), Nigerian photographer
Emeka Ononye (born 1992), Canadian soccer player
Emeka Onowu (born 1984), Nigerian politician
Emeka Onwuamaegbu (born 1959), Nigerian general
Emeka Onyemaechi (born 1974), Nigerian judoka
Emeka Opara (born 1984), Nigerian footballer
Emeka Ossai, Nigerian actor

S
Emeka Sibeudu (born 1958), Nigerian politician

U
Emeka Udechuku (born 1979), English discus thrower
Emeka Jude Ugali (born 1982), Nigerian footballer
Emeka Umeh (born 1999), Nigerian footballer

References